Dual adapter for phosphotyrosine and 3-phosphotyrosine and 3-phosphoinositide is a protein that in humans is encoded by the DAPP1 gene.

References

Further reading